Ken Chase may refer to:
Ken Chase (baseball), Major League Baseball player
Ken Chase (make-up artist) (born 1942), American make-up artist
Kenneth Chase, American Republican politician